The Methodist Ladies' College, Perth (MLC Perth), is an independent, Uniting Church, day and boarding school for girls, located in Claremont, a western suburb of Perth, Western Australia.

Founded by the Methodist Church of Australia in 1907, MLC is a non-selective school, and currently caters for more than 1,170 girls from pre-kindergarten to Year 12, including 90 boarders.

The college was ranked as the number one TEE school in the state for 2006 and 2008 seeing 55.1 percent of students achieving a mark of seventy five percent or above in at least one subject.

History
The foundation stone of the Methodist Ladies' College was laid, and building began in 1907, by the Methodist Church of Australia. Classes were first commenced in February 1908 with 31-day girls and 23 boarders.

The early traditions of the college were established by Maud Connell, Head Mistress from 1908 to 1913, who chose the colours of green and gold, and the school motto Per Ardua Ad Alta, which may be translated from Latin as "Strive for the Highest". In 1917, MLC's first university students graduated from the University of Western Australia, which had begun teaching in 1913.

MLC became a school of the Uniting Church in Australia in the 1970s, as the Methodist, Presbyterian and Congregational Churches came together to form the Uniting Church.

House system
As with most Australian schools, MLC utilises a house system through which girls participate in inter-house activities.  When the house system first came into effect in June 1927, there were four houses: Athens, Rome, Sparta and Troy.  In 1967, two more houses were added, Corinth and Olympia.  Each house is named after a famous ancient city.
 Athens – green
 Corinth – purple
 Olympia – white
 Rome – red
 Sparta – yellow
 Troy – blue

Annual house events include:
 House Singing, Mime and Drama Day (HSMD), in which every girl from years 7 through to year 12 compete in at least one activity for their house.
 A choir performance conducted by two Year 12 students. Each house performs one song chosen by the conductresses. Part of HSMD.
 A mime performance for students in Years 7, 8 and 9, directed by two Year 11 students. Part of HSMD.
 A drama performance for Years 10, 11 and 12 students, directed by two students from Year 12. Part of HSMD.
 Interhouse Sports – Throughout the year the students participate in many sporting activities for their house, such as swimming in term 1, and athletics in term 2.

A new initiative in 2010 is The Spirit Cape. In all house events, houses will also compete for the Spirit Cape with it being awarded to the house that shows the most spirit over the course of the day. At the end of the year, one house will be awarded the Spirit Cape for the showing the most year-long house spirit. In 2010, Athens won the inaugural year-long Spirit Cape.

Annual events
MLC holds a large number of events annually for sports and the arts, including:
 The Heather Lamont Festival, named after Heather Lamont, a boarder from 1958–1959, who was killed in an accident on her parents' farm during the Christmas holidays. It became a house competition featuring activities such as singing, dancing, music, Languages; French, German and Japanese, cooking, photography, visual art, debating, public speaking and drama.
 College Sunday, a church service held in late March for all students and their families. Attendants wear white and there are performances from different groups in the college.

Academics
ATAR for Year 12 students

Year - Rank - Median score

2019 - #6 - 89.95

2018 - #4 - 92.55

2017 - #19 - 87.5

2016 - #9 - 90.3

The school has performed well in the WACE exams and is often rated as one of the best schools in the state.

Notable alumnae
Alumnae of MLC are known as Collegians. Some notable Collegians include:

Entertainment, media and the arts
Jill Birt – Keyboard player for The Triffids
Estelle Blackburn – Award-winning journalist
Isla Fisher – Actress in television show Home and Away and film Wedding Crashers and Confessions of a Shopaholic. She married Sacha Baron Cohen on 15 March 2010, in Paris. Fisher and Baron Cohen have a daughter, Olive, born 19 October 2007, in Los Angeles.
Trilby Glover – Actress in television show The Starter Wife
Nicole Harrison – Model
Dorothy Hollingsworth – Creator and presenter (known as 'Miss Fleming') of ABC Radio series Let’s Join In from 1951–1989
Georgi Kay – Musician 
Holly Ransom – Social entrepreneur and activist
Rose Skinner – Art-dealer
Freya Tingley – Actress
Bridget Malcolm Model
Hannah Fairweather Comedian/Writer

Medicine and science
Freda Jacob – Founder of the Independent Living Centre of Western Australia
Marjorie Jean Lyon – Surgeon and Prisoner of war

Politics, public service and the law
Mia Davies – Leader of the National Party in Western Australia
Chris McDiven – Federal President of the Liberal Party of Australia (also attended Penrhos College, Perth)
Kezia Purick – Northern Territory politician, Speaker of the Legislative Assembly
Lisa Scaffidi – Lord Mayor of Perth

Sport
Nicole Bolton – international cricketer (Australia)
Rachel Harris – Olympic swimmer, Sydney 2000; Commonwealth Games swimmer, Kuala Lumpur 1998 (Gold Medallist) 
Minjee Lee – Professional and Olympic golfer (also attended Corpus Christi College, Perth)
Elise Rechichi – Olympic sailor, Beijing (Quingdao) 2008 (Gold Medallist)
Allana Slater – Olympic gymnast, Sydney 2000; Commonwealth Games gymnast, Kuala Lumpur 1998 (Gold Medallist), Manchester 2002 (Gold Medallist)

See also
 List of schools in the Perth metropolitan area
 List of boarding schools

References

Further reading

External links
 Official website

Girls' schools in Western Australia
Junior School Heads Association of Australia Member Schools in Western Australia
Boarding schools in Western Australia
Educational institutions established in 1907
Former Methodist schools in Australia
Uniting Church schools in Australia
Private primary schools in Perth, Western Australia
Private secondary schools in Perth, Western Australia
Claremont, Western Australia
1907 establishments in Australia
Alliance of Girls' Schools Australasia